The Glacier Express (GEX) is a direct train connecting railway stations of the two major mountain resorts of Zermatt and St. Moritz via Andermatt in the central Swiss Alps. The train is not an "express" in the sense of being a high-speed train, but rather, in the sense that it provides a one-seat ride for an 8-hours-long end-to-end  journey, and omits stops made by local trains. The Glacier Express is known as the slowest express train in the world. As St. Moritz and Zermatt are home to two well-known mountains, the Glacier Express is also said to travel from Matterhorn to Piz Bernina.

The journey from Zermatt starts at the dead end of an Alpine valley, the Mattertal, just below the world-renowned Matterhorn at an elevation of  before it descends to the huge valley of the Valais in Brig. From Chur, the capital of the canton of Graubünden, the GEX backtracks to higher altitudes again in order to reach the resort St. Moritz in a further valley to the south.

Since 2017, the train is operated by the Glacier Express AG, a cooperation jointly owned by the former operators Matterhorn Gotthard Bahn (MGB) and Rhaetian Railway (RhB). For much of its journey, it also passes along and through the World Heritage Site known as the Rhaetian Railway in the Albula / Bernina Landscapes.

The first Glacier Express started on 30 June 1930 at 07:30 in Zermatt. Initially, it was operated by three railway companies: the Visp-Zermatt-Bahn (VZ), the Furka Oberalp Bahn (FO), and the RhB. Since 2003, the train has been operated by RhB and the MGB, which arose from a merger between the BVZ and the FO. Since 2017 the Glacier Express AG, owned by the two former operators, runs the train of the same name.

The entire line is metre gauge (narrow gauge), with  using the rack-and-pinion system both for ascending steep grades and to control descent.

History

Early years
The completion of the final portion of the FO in 1926 opened up the Cantons of Valais and Graubünden to further tourist development.  In particular, a pathway was laid for the introduction of Kurswagen (through coaches) between Brig and Chur, and between Brig and St. Moritz.

In early June 1930, the then Visp–Zermatt Bahn was extended to Brig by the opening of a metre gauge line along the Rhone Valley between Visp and Brig.  For the first time, it was feasible to operate through coaches all the way from Zermatt to St. Moritz and return.  On , the first train of such coaches set out from Zermatt to St. Moritz, under the name Glacier Express.  The new train's name honoured the Rhone Glacier, which is near Gletsch, on the Furka Pass.

Until 1982, the Glacier Express operated only in the summer months, because the Furka Pass and the Oberalp Pass were both snowed over in winter. Initially, the train was made up of first to third class salon and passenger coaches, supplied by all three of the participating railway companies. Between Chur and Disentis/Mustér, passengers could enjoy a hot lunch in a Mitropa dining car. From 1933, the Glacier Express through coaches were attached to normal passenger trains between Brig and Zermatt.

In the earliest years of the Glacier Express, electric locomotives were used to haul the Glacier Express on the BVZ and the RhB, but steam locomotives were used on the FO. That changed in 1941-1942, when overhead catenary was installed on the FO, enabling completely electric operation for the full length of the route. However, no through trains were operated between 1943 and 1946, due to World War II.

Upon the resumption of daily through trains in 1948, the dining car service was extended from Disentis/Mustér to the top of the Oberalp Pass.  Between the 1950s and the 1970s, both the BVZ and the RhB introduced new locomotive classes that, when attached to the Glacier Express, enabled reductions in schedule times.  Meanwhile, the dining car service was extended further, to Andermatt.

Year-round operations
In 1981, a Glacier Express era came to an end with the final closure for the winter of the FO line over the Furka Pass and through the Furka Summit Tunnel, between Oberwald, Gletsch and Realp. In June 1982, that FO line was replaced by the newly opened Furka Base Tunnel. As a consequence, the Glacier Express not only became disconnected from its namesake Rhone Glacier, but also could now, for the first time, be operated on a year-round basis.

At that time, the BVZ, FO and RhB took the opportunity to relaunch the Glacier Express as a tourist attraction. Promotional material focused on the train's status as "the slowest express train in the world", covering , 91 tunnels, and over 291 bridges. A special promotional wine glass on a sloping base emphasised the steepness of some parts of the route.

Recent developments
In 1985, the Glacier Express timetable was completely revised.  Between 1986 and 1993, the BVZ and the FO invested nearly 40 million Swiss francs in constructing 18 new first class panorama cars for the train. By 2005, more than  passengers were travelling on the Glacier Express each year.

In 2006, a few scenes of the documentary film The Alps were shot inside the train, and further new panorama cars were added to the Glacier Express passenger car fleet. On 7 July 2008, the Albula Railway and the Bernina Railway were jointly recorded in the list of UNESCO World Heritage Sites, under the name Rhaetian Railway in the Albula / Bernina Landscapes.  Currently, the Glacier Express is especially popular with tourists from Germany, Japan, and, increasingly, India.

In 2013, the direct service to Davos was discontinued because of decreasing passenger numbers and unfavourable economic circumstances.

In 2018, two additional summer services were introduced. Each morning one service departs from Zermatt to Chur, and one service departs from St. Moritz to Brig. These services then travel back in the afternoon.

2010 derailment

On 23 July 2010, a Glacier Express train derailed near Fiesch on the Matterhorn Gotthard Bahn line. One passenger was killed and 42 were injured. The accident was blamed on human error.

Itinerary

Albula line 

Shortly after leaving St. Moritz station in Graubünden, the train passes Samedan and Bever on the high Engadin plateau. There it continues in the Val Bever before entering the Albula Tunnel at  under the Albula Pass. After the tunnel, the train passes through Preda, the first station in the Albula Valley and continues toward Bergün/Bravuogn. Between these two villages, the train has to go through many spirals because of the high difference of altitude within a short distance ( for ).

From there, the train passes on the Landwasser Viaduct, the most emblematic landmark of the railway line and continues toward Thusis where it reaches the Posterior Rhine and follows it to the city of Chur.

Oberalp section 

From Chur, the train follows back the course of the Rhine through the gorge of Ruinaulta and climbs slowly the valley toward Ilanz, Disentis/Mustér and Sedrun. From there the train enters the Canton of Uri in Central Switzerland and continues down to Andermatt.

Furka section 

From Andermatt, the train goes forward in the valley called Urseren passing the villages of Hospental and Realp. From there the train enters the Furka Base Tunnel, leaving the old railway line which climbs the Furka Pass (operated today by the Furka Cogwheel Steam Railway), to emerge in Oberwald in the Goms Valley, in the Canton of Valais. The train then continues toward Brig, following the course of the Rhone, and passes along the villages of Ulrichen, Münster-Geschinen and Fiesch, before going through another spiral.

Mattertal line 

From Brig, the train continues to Visp, then enters the valley of Mattertal and goes up, passing the villages of Stalden, St. Niklaus and Randa, where a spectacular debris avalanche completely disconnected the railway and road in 1991. Täsch is an important station as it is the end of the open road, and therefore a terminal for motorists.

See also 

Albula Railway
Furka Oberalp Bahn
Brig-Visp-Zermatt-Bahn
Furka Cogwheel Steam Railway
Bernina Express
Swiss Alps
Swiss Pass
Table of turn tunnels
List of narrow-gauge railways in Switzerland

References

Notes

Further reading

External links 

 Glacier Express official website
 illustrated description of the route of the Glacier Express

Transport in the Alps
Mountain railways
Named passenger trains of Switzerland
Tourist attractions in Switzerland
World Heritage Sites in Switzerland
Rhaetian Railway